Fisheropone (named after Brian Fisher) is a genus of ants in the subfamily Ponerinae. Known from central Africa, it contains a single described species Fisheropone ambigua, and at least one undescribed species. Nothing is known about its biology.

References

Ponerinae
Monotypic ant genera
Hymenoptera of Africa